The Tortola League was a regional association football league played in Tortola, British Virgin Islands. The winner of the league was declared as the overall champion of the country. In 2009, the league disbanded after the merger with the Virgin Gorda League to create a new top league, the BVIFA National League.

Previous winners
1970: The Bronze
1971–78: not known
1979: SKB Budweiser
1980: Queen City Strikers
1981: SKB Budweiser
1982: International Motors
1983: International Motors
1984: SKB Budweiser
1985: SKB Budweiser
1986: SKB Budweiser
1987: SKB Budweiser
1988: League abandoned
1989: Popeye Bombers
1990: Jolly Rogers Strikers
1991: Hiaroun
1992: Hiaroun
1993: Interfada
1994: Interfada
1995: Interfada
1996: Black Lions
1997: Interfada
1998: BDO Stingers
1999: HBA Panthers
2000: HBA Panthers
2001: Veterans
2002: Future Stars (BVI)
2003: Old Madrid
2004: Valencia FC (BVI)
2005: League abandoned
2006–09: No competition

External links
www.bvifa.com

Football competitions in the British Virgin Islands